As part of the foreign relations of Suriname, the country is a participant in numerous international organizations. International tensions have arisen due to Suriname's status as a trans-shipment point for South American recreational drugs destined mostly for Europe.

Border disputes

The country claims an area in French Guiana between Litani River and Marouini River (both headwaters of the Lawa). Suriname also claims an area in Guyana between New (Upper Courantyne) and Courantyne/Koetari Rivers (all headwaters of the Courantyne).

International organization participation
Suriname is a member of numerous international organizations. Among them, since gaining independence, Suriname has become a member of the UN, the OAS, and the Non-Aligned Movement. Suriname is a member of the Caribbean Community and Common Market and the Association of Caribbean States. It is associated with the European Union through the Lome Convention. Suriname participates in the Amazonian Pact, a grouping of the countries of the Amazon Basin that focuses on protection of the Amazon region's natural resources from environmental degradation.

Reflecting its status as a major bauxite producer, Suriname is a member of the International Bauxite Association. The country also belongs to the Economic Commission for Latin America, the Caribbean Development Bank, the Inter-American Development Bank, the International Finance Corporation, the World Bank, and the International Monetary Fund. Suriname became a member of the Islamic Development Bank in 1998, under the Wijdenbosch government. In 2003, Suriname joined the Nederlandse Taalunie (Dutch Language union).

Regional and international agreements
Bilateral agreements with several countries of the region, covering diverse areas of cooperation, have underscored the government's interest in strengthening regional ties. The return to Suriname from French Guiana of about 8,000 refugees of the 1986–91 civil war between the military and domestic insurgents has improved relations with French authorities. Longstanding border disputes with Guyana and French Guiana remain unresolved. Negotiations with the Government of Guyana brokered by the Jamaican Prime Minister in 2000 did not produce an agreement but the countries agreed to restart talks after Guyanese national elections in 2001. In January 2002 the presidents of Suriname and Guyana met in Suriname and agreed to resume negotiations, establishing the Suriname-Guyana border commission to begin meeting in May 2002. An earlier dispute with Brazil ended amicably after formal demarcation of the border.

In May 1997, then-President Wijdenbosch joined US President Clinton and 14 other Caribbean leaders during the first-ever US-regional summit in Bridgetown, Barbados. The summit strengthened the basis for regional Partnership for Prosperity and Security in the Caribbean - Outlining a framework for cooperation on justice and counter narcotics issues, finance, development, and trade.

Diplomatic relations 

List of countries which Suriname maintains diplomatic relations:

Bilateral relations

See also
List of diplomatic missions in Suriname
List of diplomatic missions of Suriname

References

External links 
Ministry of Foreign Affairs of Suriname (Dutch)
 Permanent Mission of Suriname to the United Nations

 
Government of Suriname
Politics of Suriname